Taxi Ramudu is a 1961 Indian Telugu-language drama film, produced by D. V. K. Raju, K. N. Raju, K. Ramachandra Raju and C. S. Raju under the Sri Ramakrishna Productions banner and directed by V. Madhusudhana Rao. It stars N. T. Rama Rao, Devika and Jaggayya, with music composed by T. V. Raju.

Plot 
Ramu (N. T. Rama Rao), a taxi driver, meets his childhood friend Saroja (Devika) after so many years and both of them fall in love. Saroja's father Ramayya (K. V. S. Sarma) works as a manager at Zamindar Janardhana Rao's (Gummadi) company. Janardhana Rao's son Mohan (Jaggayya) is a spoiled brat who is submerged in all sorts of vices. Saroja also joins as steno at Janardhan Rao when he intends to make her his daughter-in-law to reform his son. He moves to Ramayya's house taking the marriage proposal, but Saroja refuses. Meanwhile, Ramayya loses Rs. 10,000 of office cash for which he is blamed. So, he tries to commit suicide, in that critical situation, Saroja requests Janardhan Rao to pardon his father then he keeps a condition that she should marry his son. Saroja seeks for Ramu's help but fails between two fires she agrees the proposal. Simultaneously, Ramu learns regarding the issue, by the time, he raises the amount the marriage is completed. After that, Mohan harasses Saroja, even after the birth of a baby. So, Janardhan Rao keeps the property on the baby's name and expires. But Saroja returns it back to Mohan, about to leave the house when Mohan understands the virtue of his wife and turns himself into a straight arrow. Yet, Naagu (Rajanala) Mohan's old companion who is a crooked & cruel person again blackmails him but he necks him out. So, he plans to kill Mohan using a time-bomb. On the other side, desperate, Ramu becomes a drunkard, he too wants to eliminate Mohan but in the last minute, he gets back remembering Saroja. During that time, Ramu notices the time-bomb and while protecting Mohan he loses his eyesight. Ramu is admitted in the hospital after the operation doctor says it takes few weeks to remove the bandage. Mohan takes him to his house and Saroja serves him. Humiliated, Naagu makes another ploy, he kills Mohan's ex-girlfriend Mohini (Ragini), throws the blame on Mohan and he gets arrested. Fortunately, before dying, Mohini writes a letter to Mohan that she has a life threat from Naagu. Saroja somehow acquires it but Naagu catches her. Here Ramu realizes it and in that combat, he forcibly removes the bandage when he gets back his eyesight. Ramu succeeds in rescuing Saroja, sees the end of Naagu therein he is badly wounded. Finally, he reaches the court and proves Mohan's innocence by sacrificing his life.

Cast 
N. T. Rama Rao as ramu
Devika as Saroja
Jaggayya as Mohan
Rajanala as Nagu
Relangi as Jambulingam
Gummadi as Janardhan Rao
Chadalavada as Mallaiah
K.V.S.Sarma as Ramaiah
Girija as Alivelu
Rushyendramani as Saroja's mother
Chaya Devi as Andallu
Ragini as Mohini

Soundtrack 

Music composed by T. V. Raju.

References

External links 
 

Indian drama films
Films directed by V. Madhusudhana Rao
Films scored by T. V. Raju
1961 drama films
1961 films